Socrates is a 1759 French play in three acts written by Voltaire. It is set in Ancient Greece during the events just before the trial and death of Greek philosopher Socrates.  It is heavy with satire specifically at government authority and organized religion. The main characters besides the titular role is that of the priest Anitus, his entourage, Socrates' wife Xantippe, several judges, and some children Socrates has adopted as his own. 

Like more historical accounts by Herodotus, Plato, and Xenophon, the playwright shows Socrates as a moral individual charged with baseless accusations by a conspiracy of corrupt Athenians or Athenian officials although Voltaire implies that the wrongdoers are a select few.  

Unlike the historical account, Socrates deals with several judges, whereas his real life counterpart receives his punishment of death by hemlock by a jury of 500 Athenians.  The presence or mention of Socrates' best-known students such as Plato, Antisthenes, Aristippus, and others are replaced by unnamed disciples, delivering only a few token lines at the end of the play.  Socrates is also portrayed as a monotheist and a victim of religious persecution, an interpretation that is not generally shared by modern scholars and historians.

Generally, this is not the most well-known of his works in comparison with Letters on the English which Voltaire published in 1734 or the Dictionnaire philosophique published earlier in 1764.  However, hints of his contempt for government and religion are apparent here which later influenced the leaders of the American Revolution and the French Revolution.

Characters

The play calls for the following characters. English versions of their names sometimes vary slightly.
 Socrates
 Anitus — High Priest of Ceres
 Melitus — an Athenian judge
 Xantippe — Socrates' wife
 Aglae — young Athenian girl raised by Socrates
 Sophronimus — young Athenian boy raised by Socrates
 Drixa — merchant, friend to Anitus
 Terpander — friend to Anitus
 Acros — friend to Anitus
 Judges
 Disciples of Socrates
 Nonoti, Chomos, Bertios — three pedants protected by Anitus

The characters Nonoti, Chomos, and Bertios were added in 1761. The names Nonoti, Chomos, and Bertios are meant to be reminiscent of Voltaire's enemies Claude-Adrien Nonnotte,  and Guillaume-François Berthier.

References

Further reading

Editions

French

English

External links

1759 plays
Plays by Voltaire
Biographical plays about philosophers
Cultural depictions of Socrates
Plays based on actual events
Plays based on real people
Plays set in ancient Greece
Satirical plays
Plays set in Athens